Manukau, or Manukau Central, is a suburb of  South Auckland, New Zealand, centred on the Manukau City Centre business district. It is located 23 kilometres south of the Auckland Central Business District, west of the Southern Motorway, south of Papatoetoe, and north of Manurewa. The industrial and commercial suburb of Wiri lies to the east and south.

The suburb is named after the previous Manukau City district, named in 1965 by a poll of residents.

The headquarters of Manukau City Council were in Manukau Central until the council was merged into Auckland Council in November 2010. Manukau Central should not be confused with the much larger Manukau City, which was the entire area administered by the city council.

Demographics

Manukau had a population of 3,450 at the 2018 New Zealand census, an increase of 318 people (10.2%) since the 2013 census, and an increase of 711 people (26.0%) since the 2006 census. There were 1,083 households, comprising 1,764 males and 1,689 females, giving a sex ratio of 1.04 males per female, with 567 people (16.4%) aged under 15 years, 942 (27.3%) aged 15 to 29, 1,584 (45.9%) aged 30 to 64, and 354 (10.3%) aged 65 or older.

Ethnicities were 21.0% European/Pākehā, 10.3% Māori, 23.2% Pacific peoples, 52.9% Asian, and 3.7% other ethnicities. People may identify with more than one ethnicity.

The percentage of people born overseas was 55.5, compared with 27.1% nationally.

Although some people chose not to answer the census's question about religious affiliation, 18.4% had no religion, 35.1% were Christian, 1.1% had Māori religious beliefs, 17.9% were Hindu, 5.0% were Muslim, 3.4% were Buddhist and 13.9% had other religions.

Of those at least 15 years old, 549 (19.0%) people had a bachelor's or higher degree, and 471 (16.3%) people had no formal qualifications. 255 people (8.8%) earned over $70,000 compared to 17.2% nationally. The employment status of those at least 15 was that 1,605 (55.7%) people were employed full-time, 318 (11.0%) were part-time, and 126 (4.4%) were unemployed.

The Manukau Central area is mostly commercial or rural. The Puhinui East area is mostly residential.

History

The Manukau Central area was part of the largely rural area of Wiri in the early 20th century. Its transition from farmland was driven by Manukau City Council, which formed in 1965 and purchased land there in 1966 for the development of an administrative and commercial centre. The Manukau City Centre mall, now Westfield Manukau City, opened in October 1976, and the Manukau City Council administration building in 1977. Several government departments established offices in the late 1970s.

In 1983 Manukau City Council decided to rename the area Manukau Central, with the name Wiri continuing for the industrial area to the west. The name Manukau City Centre has been used for the central business district around the mall and city council building.

The Rainbow's End theme park opened just south of the city centre in 1982. Due Drop Events Centre (formerly Vodafone Events Centre), a multi-purpose event centre, is also opened in 2005 located at Manukau. Another shopping centre, Manukau Supa Centa, opened to the west of the city centre in 1998. Manukau Institute of Technology, which has its main campus at Ōtara, built 2 campuses at Manukau Central, (Manukau) in 2014 which has the Manukau train station below and (Tech Park) in 2020.

Local government
The suburb, since November 2010, is in the Manukau ward, one of the thirteen electoral divisions of Auckland Council.

Economy

Retail

Westfield Manukau City was established in 1976. It has a lettable area of 45,236 m², and has 2,113 carparks and 187 shops, including Farmers, Countdown, JB Hi-Fi and Event Cinemas.

Manukau Supa Centa covers 37,010 m². It has 40 stores including Kmart.

Education

Puhinui School is a state contributing primary school (years 1–6).

South Auckland Seventh-day Adventist School is a state-integrated full primary school (years 1–8).

Both schools are coeducational. Rolls are as of 

Manukau also has the South Campus of Auckland University of Technology and the Manukau and Tech Park Campuses of Manukau Institute of Technology.

Transport
Manukau is well-connected for transport. The Southwestern Motorway (State Highway 20) joins the Southern Motorway (State Highway 1) at Manukau Central. Eastern Line train services carry passengers between Manukau Railway Station and central Auckland's Britomart Transport Centre. Adjacent to the train station is the Manukau bus station (opened April 2018), connecting southern and eastern suburbs and a stop for inter-city services.

References

External links

Photographs of Manukau held in Auckland Libraries' heritage collections.

Suburbs of Auckland
Ōtara-Papatoetoe Local Board Area